Tiago Venâncio Alves Pires (born 20 October 1991), known as Tiago Portuga or simply Tiago, is a Portuguese professional footballer who plays as a left-back for Andorran club UE Santa Coloma.

Club career

Brazil
Born in Braga, Minho Province, Portuga started his senior career in Brazil after moving to that country at 8 months of age. He competed solely in the lower leagues or amateur football during his spell there, being part of Grêmio Barueri Futebol's Série B roster in 2012 but failing to appear in any matches.

Portugal
Portuga returned to his homeland midway through 2013–14, signing a short-term contract with Segunda Liga club C.D. Trofense. He made his professional debut on 16 February, starting and being replaced after 61 minutes of the 1–3 home loss against C.D. Aves. He played 18 games in his only full season, which ended in relegation.

For the 2015–16 campaign, Portuga joined third division side AD Oliveirense.

Spain
Portuga moved to Spain in the summer of 2016, representing in quick succession Segunda División B teams CF Rayo Majadahonda, CCD Cerceda, CD Ebro and CD El Ejido. On 30 October 2018, he was sent off midway through the first half of the Copa del Rey tie against Valencia CF at La Romareda, but the La Liga club could only win 2–1 eventually.

References

External links

1991 births
Living people
Sportspeople from Braga
Portuguese footballers
Association football defenders
Grêmio Barueri Futebol players
Esporte Clube São Bento players
Associação Esportiva Santacruzense players
Esporte Clube Rio Verde players
Liga Portugal 2 players
Campeonato de Portugal (league) players
C.D. Trofense players
AD Oliveirense players
Segunda División B players
CF Rayo Majadahonda players
CCD Cerceda players
CD Ebro players
CD El Ejido players
Primera Divisió players
UE Santa Coloma players
Portuguese expatriate footballers
Expatriate footballers in Brazil
Expatriate footballers in Spain
Expatriate footballers in Andorra
Portuguese expatriate sportspeople in Brazil
Portuguese expatriate sportspeople in Spain
Portuguese expatriate sportspeople in Andorra